Meshkabad-e Bala (also Romanized as Meshkābād-e Bālā; also known as Bālā Meshk Maḩalleh) is a village in Larim Rural District, Gil Khuran District, Juybar County, Mazandaran Province, Iran. At the 2006 census, its population was 84, in 26 families.

References 

Populated places in Juybar County